Aintree railway station is a railway station that serves the village of Aintree, Merseyside, England.  It is on the Ormskirk branch of the Merseyrail network's Northern Line.  Until 1968 it was known as Aintree Sefton Arms after a nearby public house. The station's design reflects that it is the closest station to Aintree Racecourse, where the annual Grand National horse race takes place.

History

Opened by the East Lancashire Railway in April 1849, then taken over by the Lancashire and Yorkshire Railway ten years later, it became part of the London, Midland and Scottish Railway during the Grouping of 1923. The line then passed on to the London Midland Region of British Railways on nationalisation in 1948.

The western end of the North Mersey Branch from Gladstone Dock & Bootle (which had opened in 1866 and joined the main line immediately south of the station) was also equipped with the third rail in 1914, though Gladstone Dock station only remained open for passenger trains until July 1924.

The Ormskirk line was not included in the list of routes to be closed in the 1963 Beeching Report (unlike the other two routes from Liverpool Exchange), but the route was subsequently reviewed by BR and reprieved in 1966.  This came at some cost though, as all through trains between Liverpool, Preston and East Lancashire were to be either re-routed via  to Liverpool Lime Street or withdrawn altogether.  These alterations were mainly carried out in 1969, with all through running beyond Ormskirk ceasing from 4 May 1970.  Exchange then closed to passengers on 30 April 1977, with services henceforth being integrated into the Merseyrail Northern Line and running via the new Link tunnel to Liverpool Central from the following Monday (2 May).

The North Mersey line lost its connection into the docks in 1971, though it remained in use to serve a permanent way depot at Fazakerley until 1987 and for periodic engineers trains to/from Bootle & Edge Hill thereafter.  It has seen no traffic since 2005, but Merseytravel has long-term ambitions to reopen it to passenger trains (as stated in the Liverpool City Region Long Term Rail Strategy published in 2014).

When Sectorisation was introduced, the station was served by Regional Railways on behalf of the Merseyside PTE until the Privatisation of British Railways.

Facilities
The station is staffed throughout the day, with the ticket office open from the beginning of timetabled service until 00:10 each evening (seven days per week). A waiting room and food/drink vending machines are provided in the main building, along with shelters on both sides.  Train running information is offered by automated announcements, digital display screens and timetable posters.  Step-free access is available to both platforms (via the ramped footbridge for northbound trains). There is car parking for 104 vehicles and secure cycle storage for 32 bikes.

Services
On Mondays to Saturdays, trains run every 15 minutes towards Liverpool Central and every 15 minutes towards Ormskirk. On race days, the trains have 6 carriages (two trains coupled together).  During the Grand National meeting, additional trains run to the station from Liverpool city centre. Connections for stations to Preston are available at Ormskirk.

In the evening and on Sundays, trains call every 30 minutes in each direction.

Gallery

References

External links

Railway stations in the Metropolitan Borough of Sefton
DfT Category E stations
Former Lancashire and Yorkshire Railway stations
Railway stations served by Merseyrail
Railway stations in Great Britain opened in 1849